Tangut is a Unicode block containing characters from the Tangut script, which was used for writing the Tangut language spoken by the Tangut people in the Western Xia Empire, and in China during the Yuan dynasty and early Ming dynasty.

Tangut characters do not have descriptive character names, but have names derived algorithmically from their code point value (e.g. U+17000 is named TANGUT IDEOGRAPH-17000).

Block

History
The following Unicode-related documents record the purpose and process of defining specific characters in the Tangut block:

See also 
 Tangut Supplement (Unicode block)
 Tangut Components (Unicode block)
 Ideographic Symbols and Punctuation (Unicode block)

References 

Unicode blocks
Tangut script